Stanisław Piłat (April 13, 1909 – May 10, 1993) was a Polish boxer who competed in the 1936 Summer Olympics.

He was born and died in Nowy Targ.

In 1936 he was eliminated in the second round of the heavyweight class after losing his fight to José Feans.

1936 Olympic results
Below is the record of Stanisław Piłat, a Polish heavyweight boxer who competed at the 1936 Berlin Olympics:

 Round of 32: bye
 Round of 16: lost to José Feans (Uruguay) by decision

External links
profile 
Osyp Choma, Ukrainian boxer of the Second Polish Republic

1909 births
1993 deaths
Heavyweight boxers
Olympic boxers of Poland
Boxers at the 1936 Summer Olympics
People from Nowy Targ
Sportspeople from Lesser Poland Voivodeship
Polish male boxers
20th-century Polish people